Protectorate is a novel written by Mick Farren and published in 1984.

Plot summary
Protectorate is a novel in which the decadent rich live in their gleaming towers, while the lower Dwellers teem in poverty far below, and their alien overlords control humanity absolutely.

Reception
Colin Greenland reviewed Protectorate for Imagine magazine, and stated that "Farren strolls once more down these mean streets with his hands in his pockets, cheerfully pessimistic. He quite likes it all. really. No great writer, Farren, but nobody's fool either, and that's quite valuable these days."

Reviews
Review by Richard Law (1985) in Fantasy Review, April 1985
Review by Paul McGuire (1986) in Science Fiction Review, Spring 1986
Review by Don D'Ammassa (1986) in Science Fiction Chronicle, #79 April 1986

References

1984 British novels